Dame Sarah Jane Asplin  (born 16 September 1959) is a British judge of the Court of Appeal of England and Wales.  She was granted the customary appointment as Dame Commander of the Order of the British Empire on appointment as a High Court judge in 2012, becoming the third woman appointed to the Chancery Division.

Education
Asplin attended Southampton Sixth Form College for Girls and read law at Fitzwilliam College, Cambridge, earning a BA in Law in 1982 (promoted to MA (Cantab) by seniority in 1986). She went on to obtain the degree of BCL at St Edmund Hall, Oxford.

Legal career
Asplin was called to the bar (Gray's Inn) in 1984 and was appointed a Queen's Counsel in 2002. She became the Head of Chambers at 3 Stone Buildings in 2009, and was a deputy High Court Judge until her appointment to the High Court on 1 October 2012 as the Honourable Mrs Justice Asplin. She was the third woman to be assigned to the Chancery Division, after Mary Arden and Sonia Proudman.

On 22 February 2013, she was appointed as Dame Commander of the Order of the British Empire.

She was promoted to the Court of Appeal on 7 October 2017.

In January 2019, Dame Sarah's appointment as Chair of the Church of England's Clergy Discipline Commission was announced. She simultaneously became the President of the Tribunals.

Personal life
In 1986, Asplin married Nicholas A. Sherwin, a solicitor with Clifford Chance, who had been a contemporary at Cambridge.

References

1959 births
Living people
Alumni of Fitzwilliam College, Cambridge
Alumni of St Edmund Hall, Oxford
English women judges
Chancery Division judges
English King's Counsel
Lady Justices of Appeal
Place of birth missing (living people)
English women lawyers
21st-century King's Counsel
Dames Commander of the Order of the British Empire
Members of the Privy Council of the United Kingdom
Members of Gray's Inn